Harriet Johnson may refer to:

 Harriet C. Johnson (1845–1907), African-American suffragist and educator
 Harriet McBryde Johnson (1957–2008), American author, attorney, and disability rights activist
 Harriet Finlay-Johnson (1871–1956), British educationalist
 Harriet Merrill Johnson (1886–?), American educationalist

See also
 Mont and Harriet Johnson House, Springville, Utah, USA
 Harry Johnson (disambiguation)
 Harriet (disambiguation)
 Johnson (disambiguation)